Canoparmelia is a genus of lichen-forming fungi in the family Parmeliaceae. The widespread genus contains about 35 species. Canoparmelia, a segregate of the parmelioid lichen genus Pseudoparmelia, was circumscribed by John Elix and Mason Hale in 1986.

Description
Canoparmelia lichens have grey or rarely yellow-green thalli containing the secondary chemicals atranorin and chloroatranorin, or rarely usnic acid, in the cortex. The thallus is made of more or less rotund lobes that are 3.0–5.0 mm wide and lack cilia; the medulla is white. The underside of the thallus is black or brown with naked brown margins and simple rhizines of the same colour. Canoparmelia produces small ellipsoid ascospores that measure 10–14 by 6–8 μm. The conidia are fusiform (spindle-shaped) or bifusiform, measuring 7–10 μm long.

Species

Canoparmelia alabamensis  
Canoparmelia albomaculata  – Brazil
Canoparmelia amabilis 
Canoparmelia antedeluvialis 
Canoparmelia aptata 
Canoparmelia austroamericana 
Canoparmelia caribaea 
Canoparmelia caroliniana 
Canoparmelia cassa  – Brazil
Canoparmelia concrescens 
Canoparmelia consanguinea  – Brazil
Canoparmelia corrugativa 
Canoparmelia cryptochlorophaea 
Canoparmelia ecaperata 
Canoparmelia epileuca 
Canoparmelia eruptens 
Canoparmelia herveyensis  – Australia
Canoparmelia inornata 
Canoparmelia martinicana 
Canoparmelia nairobiensis 
Canoparmelia nashii 
Canoparmelia owariensis 
Canoparmelia pustulescens 
Canoparmelia pustulifera  – Brazil
Canoparmelia quintarigera  – Magagascar
Canoparmelia rarotongensis  – Rarotonga
Canoparmelia raunkiaeri 
Canoparmelia rodriguesiana 
Canoparmelia roseoreagens  – Brazil
Canoparmelia rupicola 
Canoparmelia sanguinea  – Brazil
Canoparmelia somaliensis 
Canoparmelia subroseoreagens  – Brazil
Canoparmelia tamaulipensis 
Canoparmelia terrapapia 
Canoparmelia texana 
Canoparmelia zambiensis 
Canoparmelia zimbabwensis 

The taxon once named Canoparmelia amazonica  has been analysed molecularly and shown to belong in the genus Parmelinella.

References

Parmeliaceae
Lichen genera
Lecanorales genera
Taxa described in 1986
Taxa named by Mason Hale
Taxa named by John Alan Elix